Aerolíneas Argentinas Flight 707 was an international Asunción–Formosa–Corrientes–Rosario–Buenos Aires passenger service operated with an Avro 748-105 Srs. 1, registration LV-HGW, named "Ciudad de Bahía Blanca", that crashed on 4 February 1970 near the city of Loma Alta, Chaco, Argentina.

Description 
While en route on its third leg between Camba Puntá Airport (now Doctor Fernando Piragine Niveyro International Airport) in Corrientes and Fisherton Airport (now Islas Malvinas International Airport) in Rosario, the aircraft flew into a cumulonimbus cloud; the pilots lost control of the aircraft after it encountered severe turbulence, the plane entered a left bank of 90 degrees and entered a 45-degree dive, it then crashed into the ground. All 37 occupants of the aircraft (33 passengers and 4 crew members) perished in the accident.

Cause 
The cause of the accident was found to be loss of control of the airplane and collision with terrain when encountering a zone with adverse meteorological conditions and severe turbulence.

See also 

Aerolíneas Argentinas accidents and incidents

References

External links
 Final report – Junta de Investigaciones de Accidentes de Aviación Civil  (Archive)

1970 meteorology
Aviation accidents and incidents in 1970
Aviation accidents and incidents in Argentina
Airliner accidents and incidents caused by weather
Accidents and incidents involving the Hawker Siddeley HS 748
Aerolíneas Argentinas accidents and incidents
February 1970 events in South America